Events from the year 1986 in Czechoslovakia.

Incumbents
President: Gustáv Husák.
Prime Minister: Lubomír Štrougal.

Events
23 May – Parliamentary elections are held with 99.39 percent turnout.
20 October – Abortion is fully legalised in the Czech Socialist Republic. The law came into effect in the Slovak Socialist Republic three days later.

Popular culture

Film
Forbidden Dreams, directed by Karel Kachyňa is released.
Krysař, directed by Jiří Barta, is released. The film was later released in English under the title The Pied Piper.
Scalpel, Please, directed by Jiří Svoboda, is released.

Births
19 December – Zuzana Hejnová, winner of the silver medal in athletics at the 2012 Summer Olympics.

Deaths
10 January – Jaroslav Seifert, writer, winner of the 1984 Nobel Prize in Literature (born 1901).
15 January – Anna Zemánková, artist (born 1908).
27 August – Olga Šilhánová, gymnast, gold medal winner at the 1948 Summer Olympics (born 1920).
9 November – Jaroslava Muchová, artist (born 1909).

References

Citations

Bibliography

Czechoslovakia
1986 in Czechoslovakia
Czechoslovakia
1980s in Czechoslovakia
Years of the 20th century in Czechoslovakia